In mathematics, the Rankin–Cohen bracket of two modular forms is another modular form, generalizing the product of two modular forms.
 gave some general conditions for polynomials in derivatives of modular forms to be modular forms, and  found the explicit examples of such polynomials that give Rankin–Cohen brackets.

Definition

It is a modular form of weight k + h + 2n.

Representation theory

The mysterious formula for the Rankin–Cohen bracket can be explained in terms of representation theory. Modular forms can be regarded as lowest weight vectors for discrete series representations of SL2(R) in a space of functions on SL2(R)/SL2(Z). The tensor product of two lowest weight representations corresponding to modular forms f and g splits as a direct sum of lowest weight representations indexed by non-negative integers n, and a short calculation shows that the corresponding lowest weight vectors are the Rankin–Cohen brackets [f,g]n.

Rings of modular forms
The zero-th Rankin–Cohen bracket is the Lie bracket when considering a ring of modular forms as a Lie algebra.

References

 

Modular forms